Hiroya Takada (born August 16, 1977) is a Japanese mixed martial artist who competed in the Heavyweight division. In wrestling he won three stages in 2012. In 1998 he was All-Japan Junior Olympic Games 83 kg class winner and in 1999 he was All Japan Student Wrestling 97 kg class tournament runner. In 1999 he won the Kanto human society tournament 97 kg class.

He competed in the Rings Battle Genesis vol.6 in 2000 and Kontendazu in July 2000. He also competed in Abu Dhabi in January 2000.

Mixed martial arts record

|-
| Loss
| align=center| 1-3
| Katsuhisa Fujii
| Decision (majority)
| Pancrase: 2002 Anniversary Show
| 
| align=center| 3
| align=center| 5:00
| Yokohama, Japan
| 
|-
| Win
| align=center| 1-2
| Takao Yamamoto
| Decision (Unanimous)
| Pancrase: Spirit 3
| 
| align=center| 2
| align=center| 5:00
| Tokyo, Japan
|
|-
| Loss
| align=center| 0-2
| Kazuo Takahashi
| Submission (guillotine choke)
| Pancrase - 2001 Anniversary Show
| 
| align=center| 2
| align=center| 0:22
| Kanagawa, Japan
| 
|-
| Loss
| align=center| 0-1
| Fedor Emelianenko
| KO (Punches)
| Rings: Battle Genesis Vol. 6
| 
| align=center| 1
| align=center| 0:12
| Tokyo, Tokyo, Japan
|

External links
 

Living people
Japanese male mixed martial artists
Heavyweight mixed martial artists
Mixed martial artists utilizing wrestling
Japanese male sport wrestlers
Amateur wrestlers
1977 births